The 1981 Donnay Open was a men's tennis tournament played on outdoor clay courts at the Nice Lawn Tennis Club in Nice, France, and was part of the 1981 Volvo Grand Prix. It was the 10th edition of the tournament and was held from 6 April until 4 April 1981. First-seeded Yannick Noah won the singles title.

Finals

Singles
 Yannick Noah defeated  Mario Martínez 6–4, 6–2
 It was Noah's 2nd singles title of the year and the 7th of his career.

Doubles
 Pascal Portes /  Yannick Noah defeated  Chris Lewis /  Pavel Složil 4–6, 6–3, 6–4

References

External links
 ITF tournament edition details

Donnay Open
1981
Donnay Open
Donnay Open
20th century in Nice